Kothammuriyattom is a village folk art form of northern Kerala, India. It is in fact Godavariyattom. Basically it is a theyyam (a popular ritual form of worship of North Malabar), with the image of a cow-face attached to mid part of the body. Usually a boy is selected to do this. Special hair work, face pack, and costumes accompany this. Paniyas also assist the main character. It is believed that, after this play, the country becomes prosperous with more yields and increased number of livestock. With drum patterns serving as the music, the speech is both socially conscious and humorous.

See also
 Arts of Kerala
 Kerala Folklore Akademi

Dances of Kerala
Ritual dances
Arts of Kerala